Morainvilliers is a commune in the Yvelines department in the Île-de-France region in north-central France.

Morainvilliers is one of the French cities with the highest per capita tax income and is characterised by particularly high property prices. Its pleasant living environment and its proximity to Paris (30 km) make it a residential community much sought-after by the wealthiest households. The commune is composed of Morainvilliers and also of a small village, Bures, the full name of the commune is  Morainvilliers-Bures.

See also
Communes of the Yvelines department

References

Communes of Yvelines